Mobile cloud storage is a form of cloud storage that is accessible on mobile devices such as laptops, tablets, and smartphones. Mobile cloud storage providers offer services that allow the user to create and organize files, folders, music, and photos, similar to other cloud computing models. Services are used by both individuals and companies. Most cloud file storage providers offer limited free use but charge for additional storage once the free limit is exceeded. These costs are usually charged as a monthly subscription rate and have different rates depending on the amount of storage desired.

In 2018, cloud services revenue was about $182.4 billion and in 2022 it is projected to grow to $331.2 billion. The cloud storage industry was projected to grow 17.2 percent in 2019.

Some mobile device manufacturers include mobile cloud storage apps with their product. These apps facilitate synchronization of user files across multiple platforms. Part of the process for setting up new mobile devices frequently includes configuring a cloud storage service to Backup the device's files and information. Apple iOS devices come pre-loaded and configured to use Apple's mobile cloud storage service iCloud.  Google offers a similar feature with the Android operating system by backing up the device using a Google Drive account. The Samsung Galaxy smartphone has partnered with Dropbox, while Microsoft similarly offers Microsoft OneDrive.

Some mobile cloud storage apps are platform-independent. For example, Nasuni's Mobile Access app is available on any Android or iOS device.

Most companies offering Cloud Storage have secure websites to access files allowing use on any device that can browse the Internet.

See also 
 Cloud storage
 Comparison of file hosting services
 Document Collaboration

References 

 Kovar, Joseph F. (2012). CTERA Intros Mobile Cloud Storage Apps For Secure File Access (Press release). CRN News
 Mearian, Lucas (2012). Mobile devices bring cloud storage – and security risks – to work. Computerworldhttps://www.computerworld.com/article/2504123/mobile-devices-bring-cloud-storage----and-security-risks----to-work.html
 Moltzen, Edward F. (2012). Mobile Device Cloud Storage: We take Six Services For A Drive. CRN News, Analysis, and Perspective for VARS and Technology Integrators. URL: http://www.crn.com/slide-shows/cloud/232600955/mobile-device-cloud-storage-we-take-six-services-for-a-drive.htm
 Paul, Ian (2012). Top 15 Cloud Storage Tips and Tasks. PCWorld. https://www.pcworld.com/article/464282/top_15_cloud_storage_tips_and_tasks.html

Cloud storage
Mobile software